= Kotla Isan railway station =

Railway station in Pakistan

Coordinates: 29.18876°N 70.371735°E

General information
- Owner: Ministry of Railways

Other information
- Station code: KTIN

History
- Former names: Great Indian Peninsula Railway
Location

Kotla Isan railway station (Urdu: کوٹلہ عیسن ریلوے اسٹیشن) is a train station located in Pakistan.

== See also ==
- List of railway stations in Pakistan
- Pakistan Railways
